The horizontal coordinate system is a celestial coordinate system that uses the observer's local horizon as the fundamental plane to define two angles: altitude and azimuth.
Therefore, the horizontal coordinate system is sometimes called as the az/el system, the alt/az system, or the alt-azimuth system, among others. In an altazimuth mount of a telescope, the instrument's two axes follow altitude and azimuth.

Definition
This celestial coordinate system divides the sky into two hemispheres: The upper hemisphere, where objects are above the horizon and are visible, and the lower hemisphere, where objects are below the horizon and cannot be seen, since the Earth obstructs views of them. The great circle separating the hemispheres is called the celestial horizon, which is defined as the great circle on the celestial sphere whose plane is normal to the local gravity vector. In practice, the horizon can be defined as the plane tangent to a quiet, liquid surface, such as a pool of mercury. The pole of the upper hemisphere is called the zenith. The pole of the lower hemisphere is called the nadir.

The following are two independent horizontal angular coordinates:
For visible objects, it is an angle between 0° and 90°.
 Azimuth (az.) is the angle of the object around the horizon, usually measured from true north and increasing eastward. Exceptions are, for example, ESO's FITS convention where it is measured from the south and increasing westward, or the FITS convention of the Sloan Digital Sky Survey where it is measured from the south and increasing eastward.

A horizontal coordinate system should not be confused with a topocentric coordinate system. Horizontal coordinates define the observer's orientation, but not location of the origin, while topocentric coordinates define the origin location, on the Earth's surface, in contrast to a geocentric celestial system.

General features
The horizontal coordinate system is fixed to a location on Earth, not the stars. Therefore, the altitude and azimuth of an object in the sky changes with time, as the object appears to drift across the sky with Earth's rotation. In addition, since the horizontal system is defined by the observer's local horizon, the same object viewed from different locations on Earth at the same time will have different values of altitude and azimuth.

The cardinal points on the horizon have specific values of azimuth that are helpful references.

Horizontal coordinates are very useful for determining the rise and set times of an object in the sky. When an object's altitude is 0°, it is on the horizon. If at that moment its altitude is increasing, it is rising, but if its altitude is decreasing, it is setting. However, all objects on the celestial sphere are subject to diurnal motion, which always appears to be westward.

A northern observer can determine whether altitude is increasing or decreasing by instead considering the azimuth of the celestial object:
 If the azimuth is between 0° and 180° (north–east–south), the object is rising.
 If the azimuth is between 180° and 360° (south–west–north), the object is setting.

There are the following special cases:

 All directions are south when viewed from the North Pole, and all directions are north when viewed from the South Pole, so the azimuth is undefined in both locations. When viewed from either pole, a star (or any object with fixed equatorial coordinates) has constant altitude and thus never rises or sets. The Sun, Moon, and planets can rise or set over the span of a year when viewed from the poles because their declinations are constantly changing.
 When viewed from the equator, objects on the celestial poles stay at fixed points, perched on the horizon.

See also

 Azimuth
 Celestial coordinate system
 Celestial coordinate system#Converting coordinates
 Geocentric coordinates
 Horizon
 Horizontal and vertical
 Horizontal plane
 Meridian (astronomy)
 Sextant
 Solar declination
 Spherical coordinate system
 Vertical circle
 Zenith

Footnotes

References

External links
 

 
Astronomical coordinate systems